The 2005 2. deild karla was the 40th season of third-tier football in Iceland. The league began on 16 May and was concluded on 10 September. It was contested by a total of ten clubs.

Teams
The 2005 2. deild karla was contested by ten clubs, six of which had played in the division during the previous season. 2004 champions KS and runners-up Víkingur Ólafsvík were promoted to the second tier; replacing them were Njarðvík and Stjarnan, both relegated from the 1. deild after finishing in the bottom two places at the end of the 2004 campaign. Also joining the division were Fjarðabyggð and Huginn, who were promoted from the 3. deild through the play-offs. Fjarðabyggð had reached the third tier of Icelandic football for the first time in their history after being founded in 2001.

Stadia and locations

League table

Results grid

Season statistics

Top goalscorers
Two players, Afturelding midfielder Þorvaldur Árnason and Stjarnan forward Guðjón Baldvinsson, each scored 14 league goals in the 2005 2. deild season.

Scoring
Biggest home win: 6 goals
Huginn 7–1 Leiftur/Dalvík (6 August 2005)
Biggest away win: 4 goals
ÍR 0–4 Njarðvík (27 May 2005)
ÍR 1–5 Leiftur/Dalvík (11 June 2005)
Leiftur/Dalvík 2–6 Stjarnan (30 June 2005)
Tindastóll 2–6 Leiftur/Dalvík (7 July 2005)
Highest scoring game: 8 goals
Huginn 7–1 Leiftur/Dalvík (6 August 2005)
Afturelding 6–2 Selfoss (10 September 2005)
Leiftur/Dalvík 2–6 Stjarnan (30 June 2005)
Tindastóll 2–6 Leiftur/Dalvík (7 July 2005)
Afturelding 3–5 Leiknir R. (21 July 2005)
Huginn 3–5 Stjarnan (20 August 2005)
Most team home goals scored: 24 – Afturelding
Fewest team home goals scored: 8 – Leiftur/Dalvík
Most team away goals: 19 – Stjarnan
Fewest team away goals: 7 – Tindastóll

Discipline
Most yellow cards (team): 40 – Afturelding
Most yellow cards (player): 6
Björn Sigurbjörnsson (Afturelding)
Ómar Freyr Rafnsson (Huginn)
Most red cards (team): 7 – Leiftur/Dalvík
Most red cards (player): 2
Guðmundur Kristinn Kristinsson (Leiftur/Dalvík)

Awards

Team of the year

The KSÍ selected a team of the year, which consisted of 11 players and 5 substitutes.

Goalkeeper
Gísli Eyland Sveinsson (Tindastóll) 
Defenders
Bjarki Már Árnason (Tindastóll), Ómar Valdimarsson (Selfoss), Snorri Már Jónsson (Njarðvík), Steinarr Guðmundsson (Leiknir R.)
Midfielders
Goran Lukic (Stjarnan), Haukur Gunnarsson (Leiknir R.), Sverrir Þór Sverrisson (Njarðvík), Vigfús Arnar Jósepsson (Leiknir R.)
Strikers
Guðjón Baldvinsson (Stjarnan), Dragoslav Stojanovic (Stjarnan)
Substitutes
Atli Knútsson (GK, Stjarnan), Gunnar Jarl Jónsson (DF, Leiknir R.), Simon Karkov (MF, Leiknir R.), Arilíus Marteinsson (MF, Selfoss), Jakob Spangsberg (FW, Leiknir R.)

Individual awards

References

2. deild karla seasons
Iceland
Iceland
3